Baragoi is a market town in Kenya, lying north of Maralal and east of the Suguta Valley. It is located in Samburu County. The entire Baragoi division has a population of nearly 20,000 (1999 census) comprising mostly people from the Samburu and Turkana tribes.

The main access road to Baragoi is the A4 road from Rumuruti-Maralal-Baragoi, which as of 2019 was being tarmaced from Rumuruti up to Maralal. The stretch of 108 km from Maralal to Baragoi is still unpaved.

See also
Baragoi Clashes

References
 

Populated places in Samburu County